The Benson Memorial Church, dedicated to St Richard of Chichester, is an English Roman Catholic church in the Hertfordshire town of Buntingford. Its name derives from the notable priest and author Robert Hugh Benson who lived locally at Hare Street House and helped fund construction of the church. Benson laid the foundation stone but died before the building was completed. The parish currently shares a parish priest with the Catholic churches in Puckeridge and Old Hall Green.

History
The church was built in 1914 by Arthur Young in the Gothic style and is Grade II listed as a building of special architectural or historic interest. It was opened in January 1915. The Lady chapel was added in 1916 and the porch in 1934. The 45-foot tall tower, surmounted by a 35-foot copper spire was added in 1939. The church was consecrated in 1940 by the auxiliary bishop of Westminster, Edward Myers.

References

Grade II listed churches in Hertfordshire
Churches in Hertfordshire
Roman Catholic churches in Hertfordshire
Churches in the Roman Catholic Diocese of Westminster
Roman Catholic churches completed in 1915
Grade II listed Roman Catholic churches in England
20th-century Roman Catholic church buildings in the United Kingdom
Churches with a Hertfordshire spike
Benson